Schizolaena cauliflora is a tree in the family Sarcolaenaceae. It is endemic to Madagascar. The specific epithet  is from the Latin meaning "stem-flowered", referring to the flowers being directly attached to the stem.

Description
It is the only species in the genus to bear inflorescences directly on the trunk or branches.

Distribution and habitat
Schizolaena cauliflora is known only from the eastern regions of Sava, Atsimo-Atsinanana, Vatovavy-Fitovinany, Analanjirofo and Atsinanana. Its habitat is humid coastal forests from sea-level to  altitude. Some subpopulations of the trees are within protected areas.

References

cauliflora
Endemic flora of Madagascar
Trees of Madagascar
Plants described in 1805